The title Earl of Kincardine was created in 1647 in the Peerage of Scotland for Edward Bruce, grandson of George Bruce of Carnock, who was the younger brother of the 1st Lord Kinloss, he in turn being the father of the 1st Earl of Elgin.

Charles Bruce, the ninth Earl of Kincardine, inherited the title Earl of Elgin in 1747, and the Earldoms of Elgin and Kincardine have remained united since.

Earls of Kincardine (1647)
Edward Bruce, 1st Earl of Kincardine (died 1662)
Alexander Bruce, 2nd Earl of Kincardine (c. 1629–1680)
Alexander Bruce, 3rd Earl of Kincardine (c. 1666–1705)
Alexander Bruce, 4th Earl of Kincardine (died 1706)
Robert Bruce, 5th Earl of Kincardine (died 1718), eldest son of Alexander Bruce (the 4th Earl)
Alexander Bruce, 6th Earl of Kincardine (1662–1721), second son of Alexander Bruce (the 4th Earl)
Thomas Bruce, 7th Earl of Kincardine (1663–1739/1740), third and youngest son of Alexander Bruce (the 4th Earl)
William Bruce, 8th Earl of Kincardine (1710–1740), son of Thomas Bruce
Charles Bruce, 5th Earl of Elgin and 9th Earl of Kincardine (1732–1771), son of William Bruce
William Robert Bruce, 6th Earl of Elgin and 10th Earl of Kincardine (1764–1771), first son of Charles Bruce, 5th Earl of Elgin
Thomas Bruce, 7th Earl of Elgin, 11th Earl of Kincardine (1766–1841) of the eponymous Elgin Marbles, second son of Charles Bruce, 5th Earl of Elgin
James Bruce, 8th Earl of Elgin, 12th Earl of Kincardine (1811–1863)
Victor Alexander Bruce, 9th Earl of Elgin, 13th Earl of Kincardine (1849–1917)
Edward James Bruce, 10th Earl of Elgin, 14th Earl of Kincardine (1881–1968)
Andrew Bruce, 11th Earl of Elgin, 15th Earl of Kincardine (born 1924)

Family tree

See also
Duke of Montrose

References

 

Earldoms in the Peerage of Scotland
Noble titles created in 1647
Noble titles created in 1707
Lists of Scottish people